A maritime pilot, marine pilot, harbor pilot, port pilot, ship pilot, or simply pilot, is a mariner who maneuvers ships through dangerous or congested waters, such as harbors or river mouths. Maritime pilots are regarded as skilled professionals in navigation as they are required to know immense details of waterways such as  depth, currents, and hazards, as well as displaying expertise in handling ships of all types and size. Obtaining the title 'maritime pilot' requires being an expert ship handler licensed or authorised by a recognised pilotage authority.

History 

The word pilot is believed to have come from the Middle French, pilot, pillot, from Italian, pilota, from Late Latin, pillottus; ultimately from Ancient Greek πηδόν (pēdón, "blade of an oar, oar").

The work functions of the pilot can be traced back to Ancient Greece and Rome, when locally experienced harbour captains, mainly local fishermen, were employed by incoming ships' captains to bring their trading vessels into port safely.

The pilot boat was made to quickly reach incoming ships from port. Harbor masters began to require licensing and insured pilots and placed regulations on incoming ships to bring pilots aboard.

Inland brown water trade also relies on the work of pilots known as trip pilots. Due to the shortage of qualified posted masters, these independent contractors fill the holes in the manning schedule on inland push boats on various inland river routes.

A Sandy Hook pilot is a licensed maritime pilot for the Port of New York and New Jersey, the Hudson River, and Long Island Sound. Sandy Hook pilots have been piloting ships in the New York Harbor for over 300 years. The pilots of New York and Boston first served on Square rigs before entering the pilot service as boat keepers, later receiving their warrants as pilots, then their full commissions as branch pilots authorized to pilot vessels of any draught size.

Duties involved

In English law, by Section 742 of the Merchant Shipping Act 1894, a pilot is defined as "any person not belonging to a ship who has the conduct thereof"—someone other than a member of the crew who has control over the speed, direction, and movement of the ship. The Pilotage Act 1987 governs the management of maritime pilots and pilotage in harbors in the United Kingdom.

Pilots are required to have maritime experience prior to becoming a pilot, including local knowledge of the area. For example, the California Board of Pilot Commissioners requires that pilot trainees have a master's license, two years' command experience on tugs or deep draft vessels, and pass a written exam and simulator exercise, followed by a period of up to three years' training, gaining experience with different types of vessel and docking facilities. Following licensing, pilots are required to engage in continuing educational programs.

Typically, the pilot joins an incoming ship prior to the ship's entry into the shallow water at the designated "pilot boarding area" via helicopter or pilot boat and climbs a pilot ladder, sometimes up to 40 feet (~12 metres), to the deck of the largest container and tanker ships. As both the ship to be piloted and the pilot's own vessel are usually moving this may be dangerous, especially in rough seas. With outgoing vessels, a pilot boat returns the pilot to land after the ship has successfully negotiated coastal waters. Pilots are required by law in most major sea ports of the world for large ships. Pilots use pilotage techniques that rely on nearby visual reference points and local knowledge of tides, swells, currents, depths and shoals that might not be readily identifiable on nautical charts without first hand experience in certain waters.

Legally, the master has full responsibility for the safe navigation of their vessel, even when a pilot is on board. If they have clear grounds that the pilot may jeopardize the safety of navigation, they can relieve the pilot from their duties and ask for another pilot, or, if not required to have a pilot on board, navigate the vessel without one. In every case, during the time passed aboard for operation, the pilot will remain under the master's authority, and always out of the "ship's command chain." The pilot remains aboard as an important and indispensable part of the bridge team. Only in transit of the Panama Canal does the pilot have full responsibility for the navigation of the vessel.

In some countries, deck officers of vessels who have strong local knowledge and experience of navigating in those ports, such as a ferry or regular trader, may be issued with a pilotage exemption certificate, which relieves them of the need to take a pilot on board.

Compensation

The Florida Alliance of Maritime Organizations reported that Florida pilots' annual salaries range from US$100,000 to US$400,000, on par with other US states that have large ports. Columbia Bar pilots earn approximately US$180,000 per year. A 2008 review of pilot salaries in the United States showed that pay ranged from about US$250,000 to over US$500,000 per year. The Sandy Hook Pilots Association in Staten Island, New York, has 50 employees across its locations and generates $7.15 million in sales (USD).

Pilot compensation has been controversial in many ports, including the Los Angeles and Long Beach, California, especially in regards to pilots who are employed by public agencies instead of acting as independent contractors. Los Angeles pilots get $374,000 a year.
	 
Compensation varies in other nations. In New Zealand, according to the government career service, pilots earn NZ$90,000-120,000.

Gallery

See also

Navigator
Pilot boat
Pilot station

References

Notes

IMO.org/pilotage

Bibliography

Harry Hignett, 21 Centuries of Marine Pilotage.  London, March 2013.

External links

 International Maritime Pilots Association
 List of Maritime Pilots Organisations worldwide
 American Pilots Association
 Pilot's Duties

Nautical terminology
Navigation
Marine occupations